The Outpatience were an American hard rock group formed in California by guitarist West Arkeen, who is best known for co-writing several Guns N' Roses songs, in 1995. They released one album, Anxious Disease in 1996; however, the group soon disbanded following the death of Arkeen on May 30, 1997, in Los Angeles as a result of a drug overdose.

History
Following his success as a prominent rock songwriter, writing and co-writing several songs for Guns N' Roses, Brother Cane, Phantom Blue, Asphalt Ballet and Duff McKagan, guitarist West Arkeen started his own project, The Outpatience, in 1995. The group's lineup was rounded up by vocalist Mike Shotton of Von Groove, guitarist Joey Hunting of Billy Joel David Lee Roth and Dear Mr. President/ Flesh & Blood, bassist James Hunting of Eddie Money and David Lee Roth, drummer Abe Laboriel Jr. of Paul McCartney Seal and keyboardist Gregg Buchwalter. They recorded their debut album, Anxious Disease, which featured notable guests such as Guns N' Roses members Axl Rose, Slash, Izzy Stradlin and Duff McKagan as well as guitarist Steve Stevens. The album was produced by Noel Golden, whose credits include Slash's Snakepit, Neurotic Outsiders and the Beth Hard Band, and co-produced by Arkeen. The album was mixed by Duane Baron, whose credits include Ozzy Osbourne, Mötley Crüe and Poison. It was released in Japan in 1996 and were shopping the record to labels in the States however on May 30, 1997, Arkeen was found dead in his Los Angeles home. His management company said that Arkeen had been at home recovering from severe burns, and that his death was the result of an "accidental opiate overdose." In 2004, Anxious Disease received a posthumous release in the US and Europe.

Discography
 Anxious Disease (1996)

Band members

 Mike Shotton – vocals
 West Arkeen – guitar
 Joey Hunting – guitar
 James Hunting – bass
 Abe Laboriel Jr. – drums, percussion
 Gregg Buchwalter. – keyboards

References

Musical groups established in 1995
Musical groups disestablished in 1997
Hard rock musical groups from California